= Lake Rudnickie Wielkie =

Lake in Poland

Coordinates: 53.434°N 18.747°E

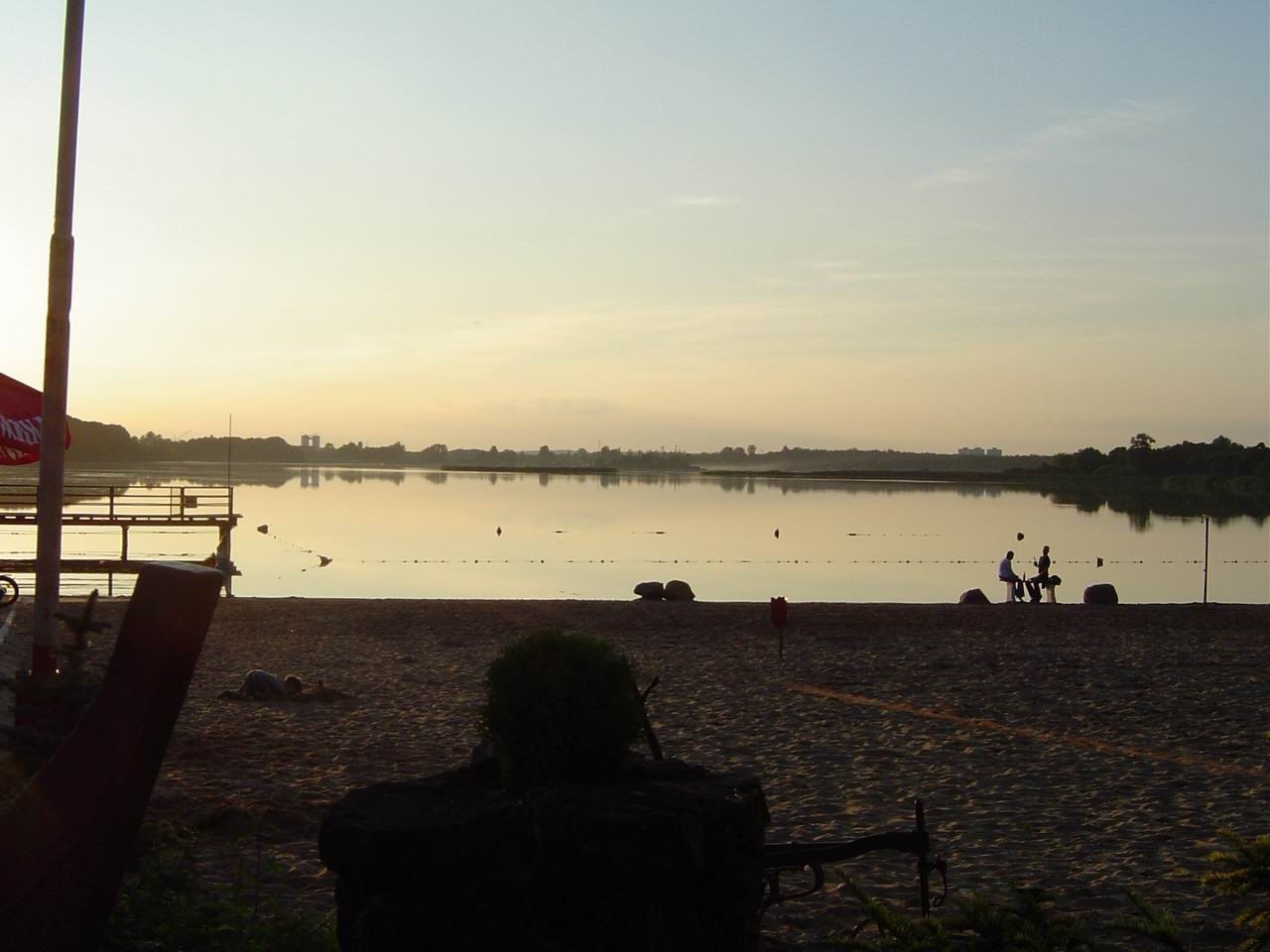
View of the lake from the beach

Lake Rudnickie Wielkie is a lake located within the boundaries of Grudziądz, Poland. It has a surface area of 177.7 hectares (439 acres) and a maximum depth of 11.5 metres (38 ft), and the water surface is 22.6 metres (74 ft) above sea level. The average duration of the ice cover on the lake in the years 1960–1970 was 130 days. In 1982 two pipelines, 312 and 565 metres (1,024 and 1,854 ft) long, were laid at the bottom of the lake, and on 16 September 1990 a third, 360-metre-long (1,180 ft) pipeline was laid, in order to discharge the surviving anaerobic bottom waters into the Rudniczanka River.

There are numerous holiday resorts, sport and tourism equipment rentals, small catering facilities, campsites, beaches, rowing marinas and sailing centres on the shores of the lake. It is surrounded by forests. It is a place willingly visited by the people of Grudziądz and beyond, both in summer and in other seasons.

== Sources ==
- Otremba Z., Miejscowości powiatu grudziądzkiego, Gdańsk: wyd. Regnum, 2002, ISBN 83-907707-7-6, OCLC 830373351.
